The Sukte are one of the clan of Zomi people in Manipur state in India, and a former subject of the Guite until before they claimed their independent chieftainship under the military cover of Pawihang in the mid 19th century CE. They were listed as Salhte in the 1947 Constitution where they are among the groups given Adivasi status.  They are commonly referred to as the Zomi by others, but they use the name Sukte for themselves.

Only five people were counted in this ethnic group in the 1981 census.  However the leader of the youth group for the Zomi claims there are 3,500 Sukte currently.  The Sukte are agriculturalists, growing primarily maize and rice.  They are mainly Christian in religion.

See also
Sukte language

Sources
article on the Sukte
http://www.e-pao.net/epSubPageExtractor.asp?src=news_section.opinions.Correction_to_a_misleading_article
http://www.ethnologue.com/show_language.asp?code=ctd
http://manipur.nic.in/planning/DraftMSDR/Draft_SDR_pdf/Chapter%203_Demography.pdf
http://www.christusrex.org/www1/pater/JPN-chin-tiddim.html

Ethnic groups in Northeast India
Kuki tribes
Scheduled Tribes of Manipur
Ethnic groups in South Asia